William "Deucem" Smith (1896–1947) was an Australian sheep shearer.  His character and skill with the shears earned him a reputation as the greatest shearer of the first half of the twentieth century.

Life
Deucem was born of the Muruwari Aboriginal tribe in Bourke, New South Wales, in 1896.
He sheared throughout New South Wales and southern Queensland between 1912 and 1947.

Deucem had five children: Bill, Val, Shirley, Larry and Gordon.  All of his boys became shearers, taught by their father.

The nickname Deucem was coined in 1912 with the (successful) declaration that he would "deuce [out-shear] all the back-bent, bagbooted jumbuck barbers" at the Dunlop shearing shed at Darling.

Deucem spent the latter years of his life in Victoria and continued to use the nickname "Deucem" until his death.

He was interred at the Sprinvale Botanical Cemetery under the "full" name William Deucem Smith on 20 January 1949.

Deucem is survived by around 200 relatives living in and around Canberra, plus those around Bourke and Brewarrina NSW

Shearing
He spent much of his professional life working the shearing sheds around Top Naas, Lanyon, Tuggeranong and Uriarra.
Deucem's shearing feats include:
 consistently high tallies at a time when the difficult-to-shear Vermont Merino was introduced,
 shearing 290 stud merino two-tooth hoggets in a single day in 1936 at Mirrool Park, near Griffith, and
 shearing 1430 sheep in one week with a broken right thumb.

Deucem's shearing prowess is touted in the essay Champion Shearers of Australia (D'Arcy Niland, February 1943):
	
Rated as one of the greatest shearers in the world, who time out of number has eclipsed records and cleaned up the best of his natural competitors... Smith is regarded as more than a champion - a phenomenon.  Even rival champions pay direct tributes to him.  They talk in the sheds about how he bowled over champ after champ like ninepins.

Near Drysdale, Deucem Smith, with a broken thumb on his right hand, the hand in which the handpiece is held, shore a week's tally of 1430.

Legacy
In April 2005, Deucem was inducted into the Australian Shearer's Hall of Fame in Hay, NSW, the first aboriginal to be honoured.  The hall honours shearers with exceptional skill, character and contribution to the shearing industry. His family donated the Hall of Fame silver shears trophy to the Australian Institute of Aboriginal and Torres Strait Islander Studies.

In June 2006, Deucem's skill as a shearer was recognized in the form of a plaque unveiled by the ACT Chief Minister, Jon Stanhope.  The plaque forms part of the Canberra Heritage Trails project that tells the story of Canberra from the time of the Ngunnawal people onward.

A documentary about Deucem's life has been green lit and is currently in pre-production. It is being produced by Deucem's great-grandson Benjamin Smith, who is also working on a screenplay for a feature film of his ancestor's life.

References

 "Click went the silver shears, click, click, click", Ian Warden, The Canberra Times, July 2005.
 "Shearer remembered in national museum", Trudy Taylor, Queanbeyan Age, 14 July 2005.
 "Gun shearer clips plaque", Paul Maley, The Canberra Times, 19 June 2006.

External links
 Shearer's Hall of Fame
 Australian Institute of Aboriginal and Torres Strait Islander Studies
 Springvale Botanical Cemetery

1896 births
1947 deaths
People from New South Wales
Sheep shearers
Indigenous Australian people
Australian sheep industry